Robert Lechner (born 22 January 1967) is a retired track cyclist who competed for West Germany at the 1988 Summer Olympics in Seoul, winning a bronze medal in the 1000 metres time trial.

References

External links
Profile at DatabaseOlympics.com

1967 births
Living people
West German male cyclists
Cyclists at the 1988 Summer Olympics
Olympic cyclists of West Germany
People from Rosenheim (district)
Sportspeople from Upper Bavaria
Olympic medalists in cycling
Cyclists from Bavaria
Medalists at the 1988 Summer Olympics
Olympic bronze medalists for West Germany